The 2018–19 Western Carolina Catamounts men's basketball team represented Western Carolina University during the 2018–19 NCAA Division I men's basketball season. The Catamounts, led by first-year head coach Mark Prosser, played their home games at the Ramsey Center in Cullowhee, North Carolina as members of the Southern Conference. They finished the season 7-25, 4-14 in Southern Conference play to finish in a three-way tie for eighth place. In the Southern Conference tournament, they were defeated by VMI in the first round.

Previous season
The Catamounts finished the 2017–18 season 13–19, 8–10 in Southern Conference play to finish in sixth place. They lost in the quarterfinals of the Southern Conference tournament to Furman.

Following the loss to Furman, head coach Larry Hunter resigned. He finished his coaching career at Western Carolina with a record of 193–229 over 13 seasons. Winthrop associate head coach, Mark Prosser, son of the late Skip Prosser, was named Hunter's successor.

Offseason

Player departures

Recruiting Class of 2018

Incoming transfers

Roster

Schedule and results

|-
!colspan=9 style=|Regular season

|-
!colspan=9 style="| SoCon tournament

Source:

References

Western Carolina Catamounts men's basketball seasons
Western Carolina
West
West